Philip III (31 July 1396 in Dijon – 15 June 1467 in Bruges) was Duke of Burgundy from 1419 until his death. He was a member of a cadet line of the Valois dynasty, to which all 15th-century kings of France belonged. During his reign, the Burgundian State reached the apex of its prosperity and prestige, and became a leading centre of the arts.

Philip is known for his administrative reforms, his patronage of Flemish artists such as Jan van Eyck and Franco-Flemish composers such as Gilles Binchois, and perhaps most significantly the seizure of Joan of Arc, whom Philip ransomed to the English after his soldiers captured her, resulting in her trial and eventual execution. In political affairs, he alternated between alliances with the English and the French in an attempt to improve his dynasty's powerbase. Additionally, as ruler of Flanders, Brabant, Limburg, Artois, Hainaut, Holland, Luxembourg, Zeeland, Friesland and Namur, he played an important role in the history of the Low Countries.

He was married three times, and had three sons, only one of whom reached adulthood. He had 24 documented mistresses and fathered at least 18 illegitimate children.

Early life
Philip of Valois-Burgundy was born on 31 July 1396 in Dijon, France as the fourth child and first son of John, Count of Nevers (later Duke of Burgundy known as "John the Fearless"; 1371–1419) and his wife and consort, born Margaret of Bavaria (1363–1424). He was a great-grandson of John II, King of France (1319–1364), and a first cousin once removed of the then-ruling king, Charles VI (1368–1422). His father succeeded Philip's grandfather, Philip II ("Philip the Bold", 1342–1404) as Duke of Burgundy in 1404. On 28 January 1405, at the age of 8, Philip was created Count of Charolais as an appanage and was probably engaged to his second cousin, 9-year-old Michelle of France (1395–1422), daughter of King Charles VI on the same day. They were married in June 1409.

Early rule and alliance with England
In 1419, at the age of 24, Philip became duke of Burgundy and count of Flanders, Artois and Franche-Comté upon the assassination of John the Fearless, his father. Philip accused Charles, the Dauphin of France and Philip's brother-in-law, of planning the murder, which took place during a meeting between John and Charles at Montereau. Because of this, he continued to prosecute the Armagnac–Burgundian Civil War, which in turn became entangled in the larger Hundred Years' War. In 1420, Philip allied himself with Henry V of England under the Treaty of Troyes. In 1423, the marriage of Philip's sister Anne to John, Duke of Bedford, regent for Henry VI of England, strengthened the English alliance.

On 23 May 1430, Philip's troops under the Count of Ligny captured Joan of Arc at Compiègne, and later sold her to the English, who orchestrated a heresy trial against her conducted by pro-Burgundian clerics, after which she was burnt at the stake. Despite this action against Joan of Arc, Philip's alliance with England was broken in 1435 when he signed the Treaty of Arras, which completely revoked the Treaty of Troyes and recognised Charles VII as king of France. Philip signed the treaty for a variety of reasons, one of which may have been a desire to be recognised as the preeminent duke in France.

This action would prove a poor decision in the long term; Charles VII and his successors saw the Burgundian State as a serious impediment to the expansion of royal authority in France, and for this reason they would permanently try to undermine Burgundy, so as to subordinate it to French sovereignty. Philip's defection to the French would prove not only catastrophic to the dual monarchy of England and France, but to his own domains as well, subordinating them to a powerful centralised Valois monarchy.

He then attacked Calais, a strategic possession of the English, but the alliance with Charles was broken in 1439. Philip supported the revolt of the French nobles the following year (an event known as the Praguerie) and offered shelter to the Dauphin Louis, who had rebelled against his father Charles VII.

Geographic expansion
Philip was generally preoccupied with matters in his own territories and was seldom involved directly in the Hundred Years' War between England and France, although he did play a role during a number of periods, such as the campaign against Compiègne during which his troops captured Joan of Arc. In 1429, he incorporated Namur into Burgundian territory  (by purchase, from John III, Marquis of Namur) and Hainault and Holland, Friesland and Zeeland in 1432 with the defeat of Jacqueline, Countess of Hainault, in the last episode of the Hook and Cod wars. He inherited the Duchies of Brabant and Limburg and the Margraviate of Antwerp in 1430 on the death of his cousin Philip of Saint-Pol and purchased Luxembourg in 1443 from Elisabeth of Bohemia, Duchess of Luxembourg.

In 1456, Philip also managed to ensure his illegitimate son David was elected Bishop of Utrecht and his nephew Louis de Bourbon elected Prince-Bishop of Liège. It is not surprising that in 1435 Philip began to style himself the "Grand Duke of the West".

In 1463, Philip gave up some of his territory to Louis XI of France. That year he also created an Estates-General for the Netherlands based on the French model. The first meeting of the Estates-General was to obtain a loan for a war against France and to ensure support for the succession of his son Charles I to his now vast dominions. 

In 1465 and 1467, Philip crushed two rebellions in Liège before dying a few weeks later in Bruges after the latter insurrection.

Court life and patron of the arts

Philip's court can only be described as extravagant. Despite the flourishing bourgeois culture of Burgundy, with which the ducal court kept in close touch, he and the aristocrats who formed most of his inner circle retained a world-view dominated by the ideas and traditions of chivalry. He declined membership in the Order of the Garter in 1422, which would have been considered an act of treason against the king of France, his feudal overlord. Instead, he created his own Order of the Golden Fleece, based on the Knights of the Round Table and the myth of Jason, in 1430. In time his order would become the most prestigious and historic of all knightly orders of chivalry in all of Europe.

Philip had no fixed capital (seat of government) and moved the court between various palaces, the main urban ones being in Brussels, Bruges, and Lille. He held grand feasts and other festivities, and the knights of his Order frequently travelled throughout his territory to participate in tournaments. In 1454, Philip planned a crusade against the Ottoman Empire, launching it at the Feast of the Pheasant, but this plan never materialized. In a period from 1444 to 1446, he is estimated to have spent a sum equivalent to 2% of Burgundy's main income in the recette génerale, with a single Italian supplier of silk and cloth of gold, Giovanni di Arrigo Arnolfini.

Philip's court was regarded as the most splendid in Europe by his contemporaries, and it became the accepted leader of taste and fashion, which probably helped the Burgundian economy considerably, as Burgundian (usually Flemish) luxury products became sought by the elites across Europe. During his reign, for example, the richest English commissioners of illuminated manuscripts moved away from English and Parisian products to those of the Netherlands, as did other foreign buyers. Philip himself is estimated to have added six hundred manuscripts to the ducal collection, making him by a considerable margin the most important literary patron of the period. Jean Miélot, one of his secretaries, translated into French such works as Giovanni Boccaccio's Genealogia Deorum Gentilium which is  good example of the sophistication of Philip's court.

Philip was also a considerable patron of other arts, aside from literature. He commissioned many tapestries (which he tended to prefer over oil paintings), pieces from goldsmiths, jewellery, and other works of art, including numerous mechanical automata and fountains at the Chauteau of Hesdin. It was also during his reign that the Burgundian chapel became the musical centre of Europe, with the activity of the Burgundian School of composers and singers. Esteemed composers such as Gilles Binchois, Robert Morton, and later Guillaume Dufay were all part of Philip's court chapel.

In 1428, van Eyck travelled to Portugal to paint a portrait of the daughter of King John I, the Infanta Isabella, personally for Philip in advance of their marriage. With help from more experienced Portuguese shipbuilders, Philip established a shipyard in Bruges, which helped commerce flourish.

Rogier van der Weyden painted his portrait twice on panel, of which only copies survive, wearing the collar of the Order of the Golden Fleece. The only original van der Weyden of Philip to survive is a superb miniature from a manuscript (above right). The painter Hugo van der Goes of the Early Netherlandish school is credited with creating paintings for the church where Philip's funeral was held.

Family and issue

Marriages and legitimate children 
Philip married his second cousin Michelle of France (1395–1422) in June 1409, when he was 13 and she was 15. She was a daughter of Charles VI, King of France (1368–1422) and his wife and consort, Isabeau of Bavaria (circa 1370–1435). They had one daughter, Agnes, who died in infancy, and Michelle died on 8 July 1422. On 30 November 1424 in Moulins-Engelbert, Philip married the widow of his late paternal uncle, Philip II, Count of Nevers (1389–1415), Bonne of Artois (1396 – 17 September 1425). She was the daughter of Philip of Artois, Count of Eu (1358–1397) and his wife, Marie of Berry, suo jure Duchess of Auvergne (circa 1375–1434). Bonne died within a year of the wedding, and the couple had no children. 

On 7 January 1430 in Bruges, Philip married his third wife, Infanta Isabella of Portugal (21 February 1397 – 17 December 1471), daughter of John I, King of Portugal (1357–1433) and his wife, Philippa of Lancaster (1360–1415) after a proxy marriage the year before. This marriage produced three sons, only one of whom reached adulthood:

 Anthony of Burgundy (30 September 1430, Brussels – 5 February 1432, Brussels), Count of Charolais;
Josse of Burgundy (24 April 1432 – in 1432, after 6 May), Count of Charolais;
 Charles of Burgundy (10 November 1433 – 5 January 1477), Philip's successor, known as "Charles the Bold".

Mistresses and illegitimate children 
Philip had 24 documented mistresses and fathered at least 18 illegitimate children.

 From Catharina Schaers:
 Cornille, bastard of Burgundy (circa 1420 – 16 June 1452, Rupelmonde), Lord of Beveren, known as "le Grand Bâtard de Bourgogne" (the Great Bastard of Burgundy), Governor-general of Luxembourg, who died in the Battle of Bazel. He didn't marry but had illegitimate issue;
 From Jeanne de Presles (circa 1400 – circa 1440), daughter of Louis or Raoul de Presles:
 Anthony, bastard of Burgundy (circa 1421 – 5 May 1504), Count of La Roche, Lord of Beveren and known as "le Grand Bâtard de Bourgogne" after the death of his older half-brother, who married Jeanne-Marie de La Vieville/Viesville (born circa 1430) and had both legitimate and illegitimate issue, becoming founder of the Burgundy-Beveren branch of the family;
 From Jeanne/Colette Catelaine/Chastellain, also known as Jeanne/Colette de Bosquiel, demoiselle of Quiéry-la-Motte (died 1462), who married Étienne de Bours, also known as Mailltoin (died 1450), governor of Gorgues and Dunkirk:
 Mary of Burgundy (circa 1426 – 1462), who married Pierre de Bauffremont, Count of Charny (circa 1397 – 1473) in 1447 and had issue;
 From Nicoletta de Bosquiel:
 David, bastard of Burgundy, Bishop of Utrecht (circa 1427 – 16 April 1496)
 From Jacqueline van Steenbergen/Steenberghe:
 Anne, bastard of Burgundy (circa 1435 – January 1508, Souburg Castle), governess of her niece, Mary, suo jure Duchess of Burgundy ("Mary the Rich; 1457–1482), daughter of her legitimate half-brother Charles; married first Adriaan van Borselen, Lord of Brigdamme (circa 1417 – 1468) then her paternal cousin Adolph of Cleves, Lord of Ravenstein (1425–1492) and had issue;
 From the wife of a Venetian merchant of the Mercatellis family in Bruges:
 Raphael of Burgundy, (circa 1437 – 3 August 1508), abbot of Saint Bavo's Abbey in Ghent, titular bishop of Rhosus and bibliophile;
 From Catharina de Tiesferies (born circa 1425):
 Baudouin of Burgundy, Lord of Falais (1445, Rijssen – May 1508, Brussels)
 From Margaretha Post:
 Philip, bastard of Burgundy, Bishop of Utrecht, Admiral of the Netherlands (1464 – 7 April 1524, Wijk bij Duurstede)
 From Isabella de la Vigne:
 Margaret, bastard of Burgundy (died 1455)
 From Marguerite Scupelins:
 Jean, bastard of Burgundy (died 25 January 1499, Brussels), provost in Bruges, papal notary, had illegitimate issue;
 From Célie:
 Marion, bastard of Burgundy
 From unknown mothers: 
 Barbe de Steenbourg, abbess in Bourbourg
 Corneille (died circa 1428)
 Cornelia, bastard of Burgundy, married André de Toulongeon, Lord of Mornay and Saint-Aubin (died 1432, Palestine)
 Catherine, bastard of Burgundy, married Humbert de Luyrieux, Lord of La Quelle on 28 June 1460 and had issue
 Cateline, bastard of Burgundy, an abbess in Ghent (died after 1515)
 Arthur, died young and had no issue
 Catherine, a nun
 Jossine, died young
 Philippe, bastard of Burgundy, died young
 Madeleine/Magdalena, bastard of Burgundy
 Marie, a nun
 Yolande, bastard of Burgundy (died 3 November 1470), who married Jean d'Ailly, Vidame of Amiens in 1456

Ancestry

Honours
  : 1st Grand Master and Knight of the Order of the Golden Fleece
  – Duchy of Orléans : Knight of the Order of the Porcupine

Refused honours
  : Order of the Garter

References

Sources

Further reading

External links

 Brief Profile – Contains a short biography of Philip, from "The Best of Dijon".
  – Short sketch of the Duke's life.
 Joan of Arc's First Letter to Philip – Mention of a letter dictated by Joan of Arc to Duke Philip in June 1429, translated by Allen Williamson.
 Joan of Arc's Second Letter to Philip – Translation by Allen Williamson of a letter dictated by Joan of Arc to Duke Philip on 17 July 1429.
 Philip III – Article from the Web Gallery of Art.

 
1396 births
1467 deaths
15th century in the Burgundian Netherlands
15th-century peers of France
 
Burgundian faction
Burials at Champmol
Duchy of Burgundy
Dukes of Brabant
Dukes of Burgundy
Dukes of Limburg
Dukes of Luxembourg
Counts of Artois
Counts of Burgundy
Counts of Charolais
Counts of Flanders
Counts of Hainaut
Counts of Holland
Grand Masters of the Order of the Golden Fleece
History of Flanders
House of Valois-Burgundy
Knights of the Golden Fleece
Knights of the Order of the Porcupine
Margraves of Namur
People from Dijon
People of the Hundred Years' War
Nobility of the Burgundian Netherlands
Royal reburials